Bangaye may refer to several places in Burkina Faso:

Bangaye, Manni
Bangaye, Thion